UPS Airlines Flight 6 was a cargo flight operated by UPS Airlines. On September 3, 2010, the Boeing 747-400F flying the route between Dubai, United Arab Emirates, and Cologne, Germany, developed an in-flight fire, which caused the aircraft to crash, killing both crew members, the only people on board. It was the first fatal air crash for UPS Airlines. The crash prompted a re-evaluation of safety procedures protecting airliners from cockpit smoke.

History of the flight
After arriving from Hong Kong earlier in the day, Flight 6 departed from Dubai International Airport at 14:53 UTC on September 3, 2010, bound for Cologne Bonn Airport in Germany. The designated crew were Captain Douglas Lampe (48), of Louisville, Kentucky, and First Officer Matthew Bell (38), from Sanford, Florida. Lampe had been flying for UPS Airlines for 15 years and had over 11,000 flight hours, with 4,000 hours flying in the Boeing 747-400. Bell had 4 years and 77 hours respectively, with 5,500 total flight hours.

An emergency was declared shortly afterward. The pilots were under the control of Bahrain's air traffic control (ATC), and they could not initially contact Dubai ATC because of thick smoke entering the flight deck that obscured the radio panel. Although they were offered a diversion  to Doha, Qatar, Captain Lampe decided to return to Dubai. The thick smoke required the pilots to communicate with nearby planes over VHF to relay messages to Bahrain ATC, as Bell was unable to see the radio through the smoke. The aircraft involved in relaying messages from UPS 6 included three Boeing 737-800s operated by Flydubai, and the Dubai Royal Air Wing's own 747-400, callsign Dubai One.

Lampe disengaged the autopilot to fly the plane manually. Upon doing so, he discovered that he had no elevator control. The fire had burned through the protective fire-resistant liner that covered the cargo hold and destroyed the primary flight control system, crippling the 747. At 15:20, Lampe's oxygen mask failed and he relinquished command of the plane to First Officer Bell. Captain Lampe subsequently left his seat to retrieve the emergency reserve oxygen system (EROS) oxygen mask, which was stowed behind his seat. However, he lost consciousness soon after as a result of hypoxia after inhaling the acrid smoke, and he collapsed on the floor of the flight deck. The fire was thought to have also disrupted the oxygen supply to the EROS mask, leaving Lampe with no oxygen to return to the pilot seat and fly the plane. Bell was instructed to land on the airport's runway 12L.

The aircraft was too high on the approach and the gear did not extend. The aircraft passed over the airport before making a tight turn. Bell attempted to turn toward Sharjah International Airport, but mistakenly turned in the wrong direction (195° instead of 095°). Radar contact was lost shortly thereafter at 15:42 UTC. The aircraft finally struck the ground at a shallow angle and at high speed in an unpopulated area between the Emirates Road and Al Ain Highway, barely missing Dubai Silicon Oasis. The right wing hit the ground first and the burning 747 skidded a few meters, exploding in a fireball, killing both Bell and the unconscious Lampe instantly. Many of the initial reports were issued by Emirates pilots living in the area.

Aircraft
The aircraft involved in the accident was a Boeing 747-400F with registered N571UP, delivered to UPS Airlines in September 2007. It had flown for more than 10,000 hours, and had a major inspection performed in June 2010. The aircraft was powered by four General Electric CF6-80C2B5FG01 turbofan engines. Before the crash, it was among the newest (#1,393 of 1,418; the 26th from the last) Boeing 747-400s built before the introduction of the succeeding 747-8.

Investigation
The United Arab Emirates General Civil Aviation Authority (GCAA) opened an investigation into the crash, assisted by the NTSB. The Bahraini government conducted its own investigation. UPS also sent its own investigation team. The flight data recorder and cockpit voice recorder were recovered and sent to the United States for analysis by the NTSB.

The GCAA released its final investigation report in July 2013. The report indicated that the fire was caused by the autoignition of the contents of a cargo pallet that contained more than 81,000 lithium batteries and other combustible materials. The shutdown of air conditioning pack 1 for unknown reasons allowed smoke to enter the cockpit.

The investigation also revealed that the cargo liner failed when the fire started, and this contributed to the severity of the damage.

Aftermath

In October 2010, the U.S. Federal Aviation Administration (FAA) issued a safety alert for operators highlighting the fact that the cargo on board Flight 6 contained a large quantity of lithium-type batteries. The FAA issued a restriction on the carrying of lithium batteries in bulk on passenger flights. Boeing announced that the 747-400F fire checklists were to be modified to instruct pilots that at least one of the three air conditioning systems must be left in operation to prevent excessive smoke accumulation on the flight deck.

The accident revived concerns about the effects of smoke in the cockpit, raising the question of whether smoke hoods or inflatable vision units should be introduced in commercial aviation. Around the time of the crash, the US National Transportation Safety Board (NTSB) had asked the FAA to mandate the installation of automatic fire extinguisher systems in the holds of cargo aircraft. UPS Airlines followed FAA regulations, which stated that pilots should depressurize the main cabin and climb to an altitude of at least  upon detection of a fire so as to deprive the flames of oxygen.

Al-Qaeda in the Arabian Peninsula (AQAP) has claimed responsibility for the crash in addition to the 2010 transatlantic aircraft bomb plot. However, U.S. and United Arab Emirates investigators had said they had not found any evidence of an explosion or terrorist involvement in that incident, and were skeptical about the claim. They suggested it was probably an attempt by AQAP to bolster its image. On September 10, the FBI and the U.S. Department of Homeland Security confirmed that the AQAP was not involved in the crash.

Dramatization 
The crash was featured in the 15th season of Mayday (or Air Crash Investigation) on 11 January 2016. The episode aired on the National Geographic Channel in the United Kingdom and the rest of the world and is entitled "Fatal Delivery".

References

External links
 General Civil Aviation Authority
 Final report
 Interim Report 
 Preliminary Report
 "GCAA : No evidence of an onboard explosion related to Al Qaeda claims on the Crash of UPS Boeing 747 – 400 Cargo" . November 7, 2010.
 "GCAA eliminates the possibility of an onboard explosion regarding the crash of UPS Boeing 747 – 400 Cargo investigation" . October 31, 2010. (Alt )
 "GCAA reveals more details regarding the crash of UPS Boeing 747 – 400 Cargo investigation"  October 20, 2010
 "GCAA reveals more details regarding the Crash of UPS Boeing 747 – 400 Cargo investigation" – September 23, 2010
 "GCAA Announces the recovery of Digital Flight Data Recorder From UPS6 Boeing 747 – 400"  – September 13, 2010.
 "GCAA Announces the Preliminary Report on the ACCIDENT INVOLVING UPS6 Boeing 747 – 400 on 3rd September, 2010" ." – September 5, 2010
 "B744 Freighter crash after onboard fire indication, Dubai, 3 Sep 10 – Preliminary Report Issued"  – SKYbrary
 "Statement on Aircraft Accident" . – United Parcel Service

2010 in the United Arab Emirates
2010s in Dubai
Aviation accidents and incidents in 2010
Aviation accidents and incidents in the United Arab Emirates
Accidents and incidents involving the Boeing 747
Accidents and incidents involving cargo aircraft
Airliner accidents and incidents caused by in-flight fires
6
September 2010 events in Asia
Airliner accidents and incidents caused by pilot incapacitation
2010 disasters in the United Arab Emirates